The 1997 World Rally Championship was the 25th season of the FIA World Rally Championship. The season saw many changes in the championship. Most notably, Group A was partially replaced by the World Rally Car with manufacturers given the option which regulations to construct to. One inherent benefit to manufacturers by adopting WRC regulations was removing the need to mass-produce road-going versions of the cars that they competed with, under the previous rules for homologation. This meant that vehicles such as the Escort RS Cosworth and Subaru Impreza Turbo no longer had to be mass-produced for general sale in order to compete at World Championship level, and thus acting as a means of attracting increased competition and involvement by manufacturers. In the few years that follow, the Championship saw the added presence of WRC cars from companies such as Hyundai, Seat, Citroën, and Peugeot, who would all compete under WRC regulations without having to manufacture equivalent specialised road cars for public sale. Both Ford and Subaru switched to WRC in 1997, except Mitsubishi who stayed with Group A to maintain the links to their Mitsubishi Lancer Evolution road cars. Subaru's transition was much more gradual for similar reasons with the early Subaru Impreza WRCs still largely Group A in nature.

Events also became shorter and more compact, event rotation system used in previous three seasons was dropped and registered manufacturers were required to contest the expanded 14 event calendar for the first time. In due course the World Rally Car rules would bring new manufactures into the sport, but at the start of 1997 it was still Subaru versus Mitsubishi versus Ford as before, although, by mid season Toyota Team Europe were back with a Corolla World Rally Car. The Drivers' championship was very tightly contested and in the end Tommi Mäkinen won his second drivers' world championship in a Mitsubishi Lancer Evo IV by a single point ahead of Subaru Impreza WRC driver Colin McRae after the final round in Great Britain. Carlos Sainz was third in the leading Ford Escort WRC. The Manufacturers' title was won by Subaru.

One major flaw in the new class system was exposed by the increasing speed of the naturally aspirated front-wheel-drive FIA 2-Litre World Rally Cup cars. The tarmac specification cars built by Peugeot and Renault that competed in the all-tarmac French and Spanish championships became major threats on WRC tarmac events Rallye Catalunya and the Tour de Corse with Gilles Panizzi defeating all but two of the WRC four-wheel-drive turbos in his Peugeot 306 Maxi, taking third place in both events.

Calendar

The 1997 championship was contested over fourteen rounds in Europe, Africa, Asia, South America and Oceania.

Teams and drivers

Results and standings

Drivers' championship

Manufacturers' championship

Events

External links 

 FIA World Rally Championship 1997 at ewrc-results.com

World Rally Championship
World Rally Championship seasons